The Royal Air Force Museum Cosford, located in Cosford in Shropshire, is a free museum dedicated to the history of aviation and the Royal Air Force in particular. The museum is part of the Royal Air Force Museum, a non-departmental public body sponsored by the Ministry of Defence and also a registered charity. The museum is spread over two sites in England; the other site is at the Royal Air Force Museum London at Colindale (near Hendon) in north London.

History
The London museum was officially opened at the Colindale (then part of Hendon) London site on 15 November 1972 by Queen Elizabeth II. The hangars housed just 36 aircraft at opening. Over the years, the collection increased and aircraft were stored at RAF stations around the country when they were not on display to the public.

On 1 May 1979, the Cosford site was opened at RAF Cosford, one of the RAF stations which had been used to store the museum's collection of aircraft. On opening, the museum initially exhibited airframes which had been used for technical training at RAF Cosford. In the following years additional aircraft were added to the collection, and in 1980 it was agreed that the British Airways Collection be displayed at Cosford.  On 21 June 1998 four additional galleries were opened, housing art, temporary exhibitions and other aviation subjects. 13 May 2002 saw the relocation of the RAF Museum Conservation Centre from Cardington, Bedfordshire to Cosford.  The centre, costing £2.4 million, was opened by Marshal of the Royal Air Force Sir Michael Beetham.

The Cosford site includes several developmental aircraft such as those that led to the English Electric Lightning and the second prototype of the BAC TSR-2. A lot of the aircraft are very rare, such as the only Boulton Paul Defiant in the world and one of only two surviving Vickers Wellingtons left in the world.

The first director of the museum was Dr John Tanner who retired in 1987. In 1988 Dr Michael A Fopp (who had previously directed the London Transport Museum) was appointed and was Director General of all three sites covered by the museum until his retirement in 2010.

The site can be reached by public transport via the neighbouring Cosford railway station on the Wolverhampton to Shrewsbury Line.

British Airways collection

In 1980, the Cosford site agreed to house the British Airways Museum collection. In 2006 British Airways withdrew funding from the collection, after which the RAF Museum did not take on the costs of maintaining the aircraft. Several of the jet airliners were subsequently broken up, including the only Boeing 707 that was preserved in the UK, a Vickers VC10 and a Hawker Siddeley Trident.

National Cold War Exhibition

The National Cold War Exhibition opened at Cosford in February 2007. The exhibition houses the museum's V bombers and other Cold War aircraft in a newly constructed 8,000m2 exhibition building designed by architects Fielden Clegg Bradley. The exhibition concept and design was developed by Neal Potter and includes 'silo theatres' which depict, in a variety of media, the key tensions of the Cold War period.

Aircraft on display

Engines on display
The Cosford museum houses a large collection of aero engines; the majority are located in Hangar 1, and a small side room of this hangar contains a display of rocket engines.

 Alvis Leonides
 Armstrong Siddeley Cheetah XV
 Armstrong Siddeley Civet
 Armstrong Siddeley Mamba
 Armstrong Siddeley Stentor
 Bentley BR2
 Blackburn Cirrus Major
 Bristol Thor
 Bristol Siddeley 605
 Bristol Stentor
 Daimler-Benz DB 610

 de Havilland Gipsy
 de Havilland Gipsy Queen
 de Havilland Spectre
 de Havilland Double Spectre
 de Havilland Super Sprite
 General Electric T700
 Junkers Jumo 004
 Junkers Jumo 205
 Lycoming O-360
 Nakajima Sakae
 Napier Lion
 Power Jets W.2
 Pratt & Whitney R-985

 Pratt & Whitney R-1830
 Renault 70 hp
 Rolls-Royce Avon
 Rolls-Royce Dart
 Rolls-Royce Conway
 Rolls-Royce Derwent
 Rolls-Royce Olympus
 Rolls-Royce Viper
 Rolls-Royce Spey
 Rolls-Royce Tyne
 Rolls-Royce RB108
 Rolls-Royce RB162

 Rolls-Royce RB.211
 Rolls-Royce Kestrel XVI
 Packard Merlin 28
 Rolls-Royce/SNECMA M45H
 Rolls-Royce Turbomeca Adour
 Turbo-Union RB199
 Walter 109-500
 Walter 109–509
 Walter 109-739
 Wright R-3350

Missile collection
The museum holds a large collection of missiles and rocket-powered weapons, including several rare German World War II types. The majority are located in the National Cold War Exhibition, with the German collection on display in Hangar 1.

 Australian Government Aircraft Factories Malkara
 Blohm & Voss BV 246
 British Aerospace Rapier
 Hawker Siddeley SRAAM
 British Aircraft Corporation Bloodhound
 British Aerospace Sea Skua
 British Aircraft Corporation Swingfire
 British Aircraft Corporation Thunderbird
 Douglas Thor
 Douglas Skybolt

 Engins Matra AS37 AR Martel
 Fairey Fireflash
 Fairey Separation Test Vehicle
 Fieseler Fi103 (V-1 flying bomb)
 German Army V-2
 Hai Ying 2G Silkworm
 Hawker Siddeley Blue Steel
 Hawker Siddeley Firestreak
 Hawker Siddeley Martel AJ-168

 Hawker Siddeley Red Top
 Henschel Hs 117 'Schmetterling'
 Henschel Hs 293
 Henschel Hs 298
 Holzbrau Enzian
 Lockheed Polaris
 Nord AS11
 Philco-Ford AIM-9B Sidewinder
 RAF Lightweight Torpedo Mk30
 Raytheon AIM-7 Sparrow

 Rheinmetall Borsig Feuerlilie
 Rheinmetall Borsig Rheinbote
 Rheinmetall Borsig Rheintochter
 Ruhrstahl Kramer X-4
 Ruhrstahl AG Fritz X
 Scheufeln Taifun
 USA Lightweight Torpedo Mk43
 USA Lightweight Torpedo Mk44
 Vickers Red Dean

Michael Beetham Conservation Centre

Also on the museum site is the Michael Beetham Conservation Centre. The centre restores aircraft and artefacts for display at both Cosford and London. It is named in honour of Marshal of the Royal Air Force Sir Michael James Beetham and it was opened by him on 13 May 2002.

Aircraft currently in storage or long-term restoration include:
 Handley Page Hampden
 LVG C.VI
 Dornier Do 17

See also
 List of aerospace museums

References

Notes

Bibliography

 Ellis, Ken. Wrecks and Relics – 19th Edition, Midland Publishing, Hinckley, Leicestershire. 2004.

External links

 RAF Museum website
 RAF Museum photo website
 Royal Air Force website
 Photo galleries of aircraft at the RAF Museum and a virtual tour of RAF Cosford
 The National Cold War Exhibition
 Churchill: Never in the field of human conflict - UK Parliament Living Heritage

Royal Air Force
Military aviation museums in England
Museums in Shropshire
Museums established in 1979
National museums of England
Ministry of Defence (United Kingdom)
Charities based in London
1979 establishments in England
Cold War museums in the United Kingdom